Together is a greatest hits album by Taiwanese singer Jolin Tsai. It was released on November 6, 2001, by Universal and D Sound. It contains her 16 songs and 14 music videos previously released by Universal and one behind-the-scenes documentary film about Lucky Number (2001).

Background and release 
In March 1999, Tsai signed a recording contract with Universal, through which she later released four studio albums—1019 (1999), Don't Stop (2000), Show Your Love (2000), and Lucky Number (2001), the four albums have sold more than 450,000, 500,000, 280,000, and 150,000 copies in Taiwan, respectively.

On November 6, 2001, Universal released a greatest hits album titled Together, which contains Tsai's 16 songs and 14 music videos released during the Universal era and one behind-the-scenes documentary film about Lucky Number (2001).

Critical reception 
Tencent Entertainment's Shuwa commented: "Jolin Tsai's first greatest hits album, the 16 songs almost represented her important works during the Universal period. And this greatest hits album was released during the contractual dispute between Jolin Tsai and her former management company. In addition, the 14 music videos that came with it were quite attractive at the time."

Track listing

Release history

References 

2001 greatest hits albums
Jolin Tsai compilation albums
Universal Music Taiwan compilation albums